François Demeure (born 25 June 1975) is a Belgian weightlifter. He competed in the men's lightweight event at the 2000 Summer Olympics.

References

1975 births
Living people
Belgian male weightlifters
Olympic weightlifters of Belgium
Weightlifters at the 2000 Summer Olympics
Sportspeople from Charleroi
20th-century Belgian people